The 1987 Cronulla-Sutherland Sharks season was the 21st in the club's history. They competed in the NSWRL's 1987 Winfield Cup premiership as well as the 1987 National Panasonic Cup.

Ladder

References

Cronulla-Sutherland Sharks seasons
Cronulla-Sutherland Sharks season